INS Brahmaputra (F31) was a  of the Indian Navy. She was built by the Scottish shipbuilder John Brown & Company and completed in March 1958. Brahmaputra served during the Indo-Pakistani War of 1965 and the Indo-Pakistani War of 1971. She was scrapped in 1986.

Construction and design
In 1954 the Indian Navy ordered three Leopard-class frigates from the United Kingdom, with Panther, yet to be laid down, transferred to the Indian order as INS Bramaputra.

Brahmaputra was laid down at John Brown's Clydebank shipyard on 20 October 1955 and was launched on 15 March 1957. She was completed on 31 March 1958. She carried pennant number F31.

The ship's main gun armament consisted of two twin 4.5 inch (113 mm) Mark 6 dual purpose gun turrets, mounted one forward and one aft, with a twin 40mm Bofors mount providing close-in anti-aircraft defence. A single Squid anti submarine mortar was fitted.

Service

1965 War 
On 17 September 1965, during the Indo-Pakistani War of 1965, the Pakistani submarine  made a torpedo attack against a target off Bombay that was believed to be INS Brahmaputra. Ghazi s ship's log recorded three explosions when her torpedoes were due to strike their target, and Ghazi was credited with sinking the Indian frigate. Brahmaputra was however unharmed and was unaware of any attack.

1971 war
Brahmaputra took part in amphibious landings at Cox's Bazar on 14/15 December 1971, landing divers in advance of the landing and providing gunfire support to the landings.

Training ship
In 1978 Bramaputra was converted to a training ship, with a deckhouse housing classrooms replacing the aft 4.5 in turret. She was stricken on 30 June 1986 and scrapped that year.

References

Other sources

 

1957 ships
Leopard-class frigates